Philosophy of Natural Science is a 1966 book about the philosophy of science by the philosopher Carl Gustav Hempel.

Reception
The philosopher Michael Friedman wrote that while Philosophy of Natural Science was more popular in its approach to the philosophy of science than Hempel's Aspects of Scientific Explanation (1965), it was extremely influential.

See also
 Natural science

References

Bibliography
Books

 

1966 non-fiction books
American non-fiction books
Books by Carl Gustav Hempel
English-language books
Philosophy of science literature